Rongxian (also called Rong Xian or Rong County) is a county in the southeast of Guangxi, China, bordering Guangdong province to the southeast. It occupies the northeast corner of the prefecture-level city of Yulin. Its population is approximately 700,000.

Duqiao Mountain, located in Rongxian, is a famous Taoist sanctuary. Other tourist sites include the Zhenwu Pavilion.

Transport
Luoyang–Zhanjiang Railway

Climate

See also
 Yangmei, Rong County
 Ramadan ibn Alauddin, a Muslim from Korea who governed Rong County in the 1340s

References

External links
Rongxian Government website 
Rongxian County, Home of Overseas Chinese 

Counties of Guangxi
 
Yulin, Guangxi